Events from the year 1510 in India.

Events
 17 February – Afonso de Albuquerque reaches Goa and successfully enters with little conflict
 30 May – the Portuguese abandon Goa to its former ruler Ismail Adil Shah
 10 December – Albuquerque recaptures Goa

Full date unknown
 Ismail Adil Shah becomes king of Bijapur (and rules until 1534)

Births

Full date unknown
 Kempe Gowda I  feudatory ruler under the Vijayanagara Empire is born (dies 1569)

Deaths

Full date unknown
 Yusuf Adil Shah founder of the Adil Shahi dynasty dies (although it could have been at the beginning of 1511) (born 1459)

See also

 Timeline of Indian history
 Portuguese Conquest of Goa (1510)

References

 
India
16th century in India